William Henry Proudfoot (11 June 1868 – 11 January 1931) was an Australian rules footballer who played for the Collingwood Football Club in the Victorian Football League (VFL) and Victorian Football Association (VFA).

Family
Bill is the uncle of Collingwood player Norm Crewther, and the third great uncle of the former Federal Member for Dunkley, Chris Crewther MP.

Football
A solidly built fullback, Proudfoot was a member of Collingwood's inaugural VFA side in 1892.

He became the first-ever Collingwood player to represent Victoria when he was selected to play against South Australia in 1894.

Proudfoot was involved in an infamous incident during a game for Collingwood against North Melbourne in July 1896 when at half-time a riot occurred with the crowd invading the field and turning on the umpire Roberts. Proudfoot, while attempting to stop the umpire from getting injured, was himself badly beaten in the melee.

Following the formation of the Victorian Football League in 1897, Proudfoot was Collingwood captain in 1898 and also had the role for the latter half of 1899 and in 1901. Proudfoot played in Collingwood's first two VFL premiership winning sides; in 1902 and 1903.

Off the football field Proudfoot was a police constable and was banned from playing football by his commissioner. He continued to play however under an assumed name.

At the end of the 1899 season, in the process of naming his own "champion player", the football correspondent for The Argus ("Old Boy"), selected a team of the best players of the 1899 VFL competition:Backs: Maurie Collins (Essendon), Bill Proudfoot (Collingwood), Peter Burns (Geelong); Halfbacks: Pat Hickey (Fitzroy), George Davidson (South Melbourne), Alf Wood (Melbourne); Centres: Fred Leach (Collingwood), Firth McCallum (Geelong), Harry Wright (Essendon); Wings: Charlie Pannam (Collingwood), Eddie Drohan (Fitzroy), Herb Howson (South Melbourne); Forwards: Bill Jackson (Essendon), Eddy James (Geelong), Charlie Colgan (South Melbourne); Ruck: Mick Pleass (South Melbourne), Frank Hailwood (Collingwood), Joe McShane (Geelong); Rovers: Dick Condon (Collingwood), Bill McSpeerin (Fitzroy), Teddy Rankin (Geelong).From those he considered to be the three best players — that is, Condon, Hickey, and Pleass — he selected Pat Hickey as his "champion player" of the season. ('Old Boy', "Football: A Review of the Season", (Monday, 18 September 1899), p.6).

See also
 The Footballers' Alphabet

Notes

References
 Atkinson, G. (1982) Everything you ever wanted to know about Australian rules football but couldn't be bothered asking, The Five Mile Press: Melbourne. .
 'Follower', "The Footballers' Alphabet", The Leader, (Saturday, 23 July 1898), p.17.
  Holmesby, Russell & Main, Jim (2014). The Encyclopedia of AFL Footballers: every AFL/VFL player since 1897 (10th ed.). Melbourne, Victoria: Bas Publishing.

External links

 
 

1868 births
1931 deaths
Australian people of Scottish descent
Police officers from Melbourne
Australian rules footballers from Victoria (Australia)
Australian Rules footballers: place kick exponents
Collingwood Football Club players
Collingwood Football Club Premiership players
Two-time VFL/AFL Premiership players